Rarriwuy Hick (born ) is an Aboriginal Australian award-winning actress, known for her roles in the television series Redfern Now, Cleverman, Wentworth and True Colours.

Early life and education 
Hick was born around 1991 in Sydney, Australia. She grew up in both the suburb of Lilyfield, and in Dhalinybuy, an Aboriginal community in Arnhem Land, Northern Territory. She was raised speaking Yolŋu Matha and other Aboriginal Australian languages before learning English, and speaks seven dialects. Her mother, Janet Munyarryun, a Yolngu woman, was a founding member of Bangarra Dance Theatre.

Throughout her education, Hick was inspired by her mother to pursue dance and the arts. She attended a Catholic girls high school and showed sufficient interest in dance to establish a troupe. In 2009, she commenced studies at the National Aboriginal and Islander Skills Development Association (NAISDA) Dance College,. She was asked to audition for the Aboriginal-produced play Wrong Skin, and was successful, performing on the tour while studying.

Acting career
Hick starred in two episodes of the television series Redfern Now (2012–2013), and as an ongoing character in Wentworth (2018). In 2022 she played the lead role as detective Toni Alma, returning to her home town in Central Australia after living most of her life away from it, in the television miniseries True Colours. One reviewer called her performance "career-best".

Dance and theatre

She established the dance group Yapa Mala and led its choreography. In 2011, she starred in the theatre play Bloodland.

In 2016, Hick starred in a revival of the Louis Nowra play The Golden Age by the Sydney Theatre Company and her performance and dance received praise.

Other activities
Hick was living in Arnhem Land at the time of the 2007 Northern Territory National Emergency Response. She later remarked that the intervention was not having an effect on child abuse like intended and instead that her family's lives and finances were being "completely controlled by the government".

In May 2013, Hick and other actors from theatre production The Shadow King in Melbourne were refused taxi rides by several drivers who reportedly drove off after observing that the group members were of Indigenous appearance.

In 2018, Hick started a social media campaign using the hashtag #ourkidsbelongwithfamilies, which became a "rallying cry" of Indigenous Australians fighting to maintain their families together against removals and resettlement of children by authorities.

Filmography

Theatre

Nominations

References

External links
 
 
 , July 2011
 Rarriwuy Hick on Instagram

Living people
1990 births
21st-century Australian actresses
Australian film actresses
Australian people of English descent
Australian stage actresses
Australian television actresses
Indigenous Australian actresses
Yolngu people